Port Robinson or Pt Robinson may refer to:

Port Robinson, Ontario
 Port Robinson, adjoining Cheviot, New Zealand
 Port Robinson, Western Australia, also known as Anketell Port